The 69th Women's Boat Race took place on 30 March 2014. The race, between crews representing Oxford University Women's Boat Club and Cambridge University Women's Boat Club, was umpired by Judith Packer.  Cambridge's crew, the heavier of the two, was entirely British, while Oxford's boat included rowers from Canada, Switzerland and the United States.  Oxford won by four lengths in a time of 5 minutes 50 seconds, their second consecutive win.  The victory took the overall record in the event to 41–28 in Cambridge's favour. It was the last time the race would be conducted over a  straight race as part of the Henley Boat Races.

Background
The Women's Boat Race is a side-by-side rowing competition between eights from Oxford University Women's Boat Club and the Cambridge University Women's Boat Club that has taken place since 1927.  Oxford went into the race as champions, having won the previous year's race by one and three-quarter lengths; Cambridge led 41–27 overall.  It was the last time the race would be conducted as part of the Henley Boat Races, along a  stretch of the River Thames referred to as the Straight Course which is used for the Henley Royal Regatta since 1924. The 2015 race would be conducted on The Championship Course on the same day as men's race.

Cambridge's number five, Catherine Foot, remarked "After training, I step back and think 'wow, I'm part of this incredible tradition'. There is nothing else I'd rather be doing than training for this event", while Oxford's stroke Amber de Vere said "All the training has been leading up to this weekend.  Next year is definitely exciting and it has added something to training, but as a crew, we're only thinking about Sunday." This year's race was umpired by Judith Packer and was sponsored by Newton Investment Management, a subsidiary of The Bank of New York Mellon, for the third successive year.

Crews

During the build-up to the race, the two universities sent trial boats to race on 19 December 2013. For the first time in the history of the competition, this took place on the Tideway on part of the Championship Course.  The two Cambridge boats were named Nudge Nudge and Wink Wink (with a third reserve boat called Say No More), while Oxford's trialists rowed in Cleopatra and Boudicca.  Both trials were overseen by Olympic bronze medallist Sarah Winckless.

Three members of Oxford's 2013 crew returned to race in 2014: Alice Carrington-Windo, Maxie Scheske and Anastasia Chitty. Cambridge's boat included two double Blues in Caroline Reid and Holly Game, while four other members of the crew had taken part in the previous year's race. Every member of the Cambridge crew was British, while Oxford's boat included Canadian Elizabeth Fence, German/Britons Carrington-Windo and Scheske, Nadine Graedel Iberg from Switzerland and American Laura Savarese (who had rowed in the Harvard–Yale Regatta for Harvard University on four occasions).

Race

Cambridge won the toss and elected to start from the Berkshire side, handing the Buckinghamshire station to Oxford.  At 3p.m., umpire Palmer dropped the flag to start the race.  Both crews went off rating 40 strokes per minute and after the first  Oxford were half a length ahead.  By the time the crews passed the Upper Thames Rowing Club, Oxford's lead was over a length.  Cambridge made a series of pushes; both crews were warned by the umpire to avoid a collision. Oxford continued to extend their lead to win by four lengths, the largest winning margin since the 2010 race. Their time was 5 minutes 50 seconds, six seconds slower than the record time set by Oxford in the 2006 race.  The victory was Oxford's second consecutive win and their sixth in the last seven; it took the overall record in the event to 41–28 in Cambridge's favour.

The former Oxford cox Rachel Quarrell, writing in The Daily Telegraph stated that the race "was won in storming style" and suggested the contest was over within the first two minutes.  A newly designed trophy, to replace the existing wooden shield, was awarded to the Oxford president by Olympic gold medallist Sophie Hosking who had won the Women's lightweight double sculls at the 2012 Summer Olympics.

See also
The Boat Race 2014

References

External links
Official website
Video of the race

Women's Boat Race
Boat
2014 in English sport
March 2014 sports events in the United Kingdom
2014 in women's rowing
2014 sports events in London